California's 67th State Assembly district is one of 80 California State Assembly districts. It is currently represented by Republican Kelly Seyarto of Murrieta.

District profile 
The district encompasses the southern Inland Empire in western Riverside County. The district is primarily suburban, with many new housing tracts and bedroom communities.

Riverside County – 21.1%
 Canyon Lake
 East Hemet
 El Sobrante
 French Valley
 Good Hope
 Hemet – 38.3%
 Homeland
 Lake Elsinore
 Lake Mathews
 Lakeland Village
 Menifee
 Murrieta
 Nuevo
 Temescal Valley
 Wildomar
 Woodcrest

Election results from statewide races

List of Assembly Members 
Due to redistricting, the 67th district has been moved around different parts of the state. The current iteration resulted from the 2011 redistricting by the California Citizens Redistricting Commission.

Election results 1992 - present

2020

2018

2016

2014

2012

2010

2008

2006

2004

2002

2000

1998

1996

1994

1992

See also 
 California State Assembly
 California State Assembly districts
 Districts in California

References

External links 
 District map from the California Citizens Redistricting Commission

67
Assembly
Hemet, California
Lake Elsinore, California
Menifee, California
Murrieta, California